Top Chef: Houston is the nineteenth season of the American reality television series Top Chef. It was first announced by Bravo and NBCUniversal on September 21, 2021. The competition was filmed in Houston, Texas, which was not featured during the series' previous Texas-themed season, as well as Galveston Island. The season finale took place in Tucson, Arizona. The winner received .

A variation of Top Chef: Portland alumni judging panel was implemented. In each episode, the trio of Padma Lakshmi, Tom Colicchio, and Gail Simmons were joined by a former Top Chef competitor, along with a local or nationally acclaimed chef as a guest judge. In addition to the returning Last Chance Kitchen, a new web series titled Top Recipe was released each week, which featured Top Chef alum Dale Talde demonstrating how to cook winning Quickfire and Elimination Challenge dishes from the season.

Top Chef: Houston premiered on March 3, 2022, and concluded on June 2, 2022. In the season finale, Buddha Lo was declared the winner over runners-up Evelyn Garcia and Sarah Welch.  Damarr Brown was voted Fan Favorite.

Production
Filming in Houston covered roughly five weeks, beginning in late September 2021 and completing at the end of October. The same COVID-19 protocols used for Top Chef: Portland remained in effect, requiring frequent tests for the coronavirus and masks to be worn by production staff. The campaign to promote Houston as the next location for Top Chef was led by Houston First, who showed off the city to Magical Elves Productions and helped scout for potential sites to highlight during the season. The set for the show was constructed at the NRG Arena. Filming for the final two episodes in Tucson was completed in November 2021, with Visit Tucson offering  to cover production and relocation costs.

Contestants
Fifteen chefs were selected to compete in Top Chef: Houston. One contestant, Jackson Kalb, was notable for contracting COVID-19 a few weeks before the show began filming. While Kalb did not lose his spot among the cast, he ended up having to compete without his sense of taste or smell.

Buddha Lo returned to compete in Top Chef: World All-Stars.

Contestant progress

: The chef(s) did not receive immunity for winning the Quickfire Challenge.
: Following Episode 5 of Last Chance Kitchen, Ashleigh returned to the competition.
: Following the final episode of Last Chance Kitchen, Sarah returned to the competition.
 (WINNER) The chef won the season and was crowned "Top Chef".
 (RUNNER-UP) The chef was a runner-up for the season.
 (WIN) The chef won the Elimination Challenge.
 (HIGH) The chef was selected as one of the top entries in the Elimination Challenge, but did not win.
 (IN) The chef was not selected as one of the top or bottom entries in the Elimination Challenge and was safe.
 (LOW) The chef was selected as one of the bottom entries in the Elimination Challenge, but was not eliminated.
 (OUT) The chef lost the Elimination Challenge.

Episodes

Last Chance Kitchen

References
Notes

Footnotes

External links

 Official website

2022 American television seasons
Top Chef
Television shows set in Houston
Television shows filmed in Texas
Television shows filmed in Arizona